Traudl Hächer (born 31 December 1962 in Schleching) is a retired German alpine skier.

World Cup victories

External links
 sports-reference.com

1962 births
Living people
German female alpine skiers
Olympic alpine skiers of Germany
Alpine skiers at the 1992 Winter Olympics